TV Koper Capodistria is a Slovene free-to-air television channel based in Koper, Slovenia. Mainly funded by state aid, the channel serves the Italian-speaking minority in Slovenia and Croatia. It can also be received in the Italian region of Friuli-Venezia Giulia.

History
The channel started transmissions on May 6, 1971, transmitting on Channel 27 on the UHF dial when in Italy there was still no private TV on aerial. The channel had a crucial advantage: it was mostly in colour. This made the channel popular in its coverage area, the Croatian part of Istria and the Italian region of Friuli Venezia Giulia. It was Yugoslavia's 2nd color station after RTS2.

When TV Koper-Capodistria appeared and met with a favorable response in parts of Italy adjacent to Yugoslavia, some enterprising Italians established a network of private transmitters across Italy, breaking the monopoly established by RAI as viewers embraced the channel's diet of cartoons, subtitled movies, sports, popular series, and more internationally oriented news. TV Koper-Capodistria also helped Italy to adopt the PAL color TV standard, as many Italians bought PAL TV sets in order to tune the channel.

In 1976, Italy's constitutional court ruled that privately owned, fully commercial stations could be established on Italian soil. As a consequence of this, hundreds of local television stations appeared in the following years, all in color. TV Koper-Capodistria's unique role was over, and advertising revenue began to dry up.

Between 1987 and 1990, TV Koper-Capodistria enjoyed a brief resurrection as a major television player. It signed a deal with Silvio Berlusconi, the owner of Italy's three major private networks, that allowed him to operate, but not own the channel, of course. Berlusconi turned the station into an all-sports service, once again making it popular throughout Italy. Viewers from around the country, as well as Yugoslavia, eagerly tuned into sports events that were not available on the other channels, including exclusive coverage of NBA basketball, with legendary commentary by US-born Dan Peterson, who spoke Italian with a charming American accent. But this arrangement did not last long. With pay television on the horizon, Berlusconi decided to end his all-sports channel in 1990. TV Koper-Capodistria was left without any transmitters in Italy and finally became what it was designed to be back in 1971: a regional service primarily intended for the Italian community in Istria.

In 2006, in the spirit of the new cooperation between Slovenia and Italy, with the support of the means of the Italian government and the Region of Friuli Venezia Giulia, through collaboration between the Italian Union and the People's University of Trieste, TV Koper starts to broadcast via satellite across Europe through Eutelsat Hot Bird 13° east. It is a new impetus to the growth of the channel and dissemination of its programs.

On 18 May 2010 TV Koper-Capodistria returns in Italy with the spread of its programming throughout the national territory through the Italian satellite television platform Tivù Sat operating within the satellite Eutelsat Hot Bird 13° east, although some programmes are only available on Slovenian territory, hence those are encrypted via satellite. On 30 November 2010, the channel ended its analogue broadcast, starting broadcasts in digital terrestrial television.

On 20 August 2020 satellite broadcasts of radio and TV resumed on Eutelsat 16 degrees East frequency 11.678 MHz, horizontal polarization, signal speed: 30,000 MSym / s, Standard: DVB-S2, Modulation: 8PSK, covering all of Europe in clear.

In a press conference, broadcast live on Thursday 6 May 2021, also on the digital platform and on social networks, TV Capodistria celebrated its 50th anniversary. In fact, on May 8, 1971, the first newscast from the Koper studio was broadcast. In August the celebrations continued with a concert entitled "We loved each other so much", the first half century since its foundation held at the Portoroz Auditorium.

Popular shows
The channel covers international, regional, and local news from both sides of the border. The editorial section for culture programmes shows Artevisione, Istria e... dintorni, L’Universo e`... and Itinerari. The shows, with documentaries, reports, and magazine formats, focus on the regional and local cultural life in Slovenia, Italy, and Croatia.

The channel is notable by the first music video TV show, not only in the former Titoist Yugoslavia, but also in the neighboring Italy, featuring popular Western music videos during the 1980s with its host Dario Diviacchi enjoining a star status among his young TV audience. The show, first under the name "Alta Pressione" ("High Pressure") and later "Video Mix", was on air every Thursday evening. A phone-in format with the TV viewers choosing among the music videos to be aired on the show, was introduced later with host Alex Bini.

The music program made the channel popular in Italy, where the show was the third most viewed TV show in 1985.

Logo history

See also
Istrian Italians
RTV Slovenija
Italian language in Slovenia
Italian language in Croatia
Slovenian Littoral
Istria

References

External links
 Official Website 
 Historical article in English

Television channels in Slovenia
Television channels and stations established in 1971
Italian-language television stations
Mass media in Koper